Argylle is an upcoming spy film directed and produced by Matthew Vaughn, and written by Jason Fuchs, based on the yet-to-be-released novel by first-time author Elly Conway. The film features an ensemble cast consisting of Henry Cavill, Sam Rockwell, Bryce Dallas Howard, John Cena, Dua Lipa, Ariana DeBose, Rob Delaney, Bryan Cranston, Catherine O'Hara, and Samuel L. Jackson.

Premise
A world-class spy suffering from amnesia is tricked into believing he is a best-selling spy novelist. After his memories and lethal skills return, he goes down a path of revenge against the shadowy organization he used to work for, the Division.

Cast
 Henry Cavill
 Sam Rockwell
 Bryce Dallas Howard
 Bryan Cranston
 Catherine O'Hara
 John Cena
 Samuel L. Jackson
 Dua Lipa
 Ariana DeBose
 Rob Delaney
 Jing Lusi

Production
The film was announced in June 2021, with Matthew Vaughn attached to direct and produce for Marv Studios. The ensemble cast was announced in the following months, and it was reported that the script was written by Jason Fuchs, based on the yet-to-be-released novel by first-time author Elly Conway. The film marks the acting debut of singer Dua Lipa, who will provide original music for the title track and score. 

In August 2021, Apple TV+ bought the rights to the film for $200 million. Vaughn said the COVID-19 pandemic gave him the time to work on the film. He describes it as his ode to 1980s action thrillers like Die Hard and Lethal Weapon. When asked about casting Cavill, he said: "I needed someone who was born to play Bond — which Henry is — and then nick him before Bond did. He plays a larger-than-life action hero with a wink. It's very different from Kingsman." Principal photography began that same month in London with cinematographer George Richmond, and took place across various locations in Europe. The production used studios in Greenford, Park Royal, and Bovingdon to shoot the film. Background shots were filmed in Greece and the United States.

The Hollywood Reporter questioned the identity of first-time author Elly Conway, whose book is the basis of the film, as the only evidence of her existence include an Instagram account with no posts and a two-line bio that says she resides in the United States. They also pointed out that her name is spelled differently, as Ellie, on the website of the publisher Penguin Random House, and said their attempts to contact her, her publicist, and her talent agent were unsuccessful.

Future
Argylle is intended to serve as the start of a franchise consisting of at least a trilogy of films.

References

External links
 

American spy films
Apple TV+ original films
British spy films
Films about amnesia
Films based on American novels
Films directed by Matthew Vaughn
Films produced by Matthew Vaughn
Films scored by Lorne Balfe
Films shot in England
Films shot in Greece
Films shot in London
Upcoming films